Gothic Electronic Anthems is the debut studio album from gothic/industrial metal band Gothminister.

Track listing

Personnel
Band
Bjørn Alexander Brem - vocals
Bjørn Aadland - guitar
Goatfather - guitar, choir
Rico Darum - guitar
Sjur "Sick" Miljeteig - choir

Production
Sandra Jensen - art direction, design, photography
Bjørn Alexander Brem - programming
Andy Moxnes - producer, recording, programming (Additional)
Peder Kjellsby - producer, recording, programming (Additional)
Rico Darum - producer, recording, programming (Additional)
Sjur Miljeteig - producer, recording, programming (Additional)
Superdead - producer, recording, programming (Additional)
Thrawn Llåvslaavk - mastering

References

Gothminister albums
2003 debut albums
Drakkar Entertainment albums